More Than Words is a Philippine television drama romantic comedy series broadcast by GMA Network. Directed by Andoy Ranay, it stars Janine Gutierrez and Elmo Magalona. It premiered on November 17, 2014 on the network's Telebabad line up replacing Ilustrado. The series concluded on March 6, 2015 with a total of 80 episodes. It was replaced by Pari 'Koy in its timeslot.

The series is streaming online on YouTube.

Premise
Ikay, a girl taunted at school her because of her looks and personality and writer of the online fiction, Diary of a Queen Bee in which she created her dream boy, Hiro. One morning, Ikay sees a boy washed ashore which is the guy she pictured in her online blog.

Cast and characters

Lead cast
 Janine Gutierrez as Erika "Ikay" Balmores / Katy Perez
 Elmo Magalona as Hiro / Juan Sebastian "Basty" Santillian III / Junifer Fuentes

Supporting cast
 Jaclyn Jose as Precy Balmores
 Gardo Versoza as Victor Balboa
 Yayo Aguila as Marissa Santillian-Balboa
 Rey "PJ" Abellana as Emil Fuentes
 Leni Santos as Rose Vera-Fuentes
 Enzo Pineda as Nathaniel ”Nate” Alvarez
 Stephanie Sol as Isabelle "Belle" Acosta
 Mayton Eugenio as Chelsea de Silva
 Coleen Perez as Molly Rivera
 Frances Makil-Ignacio as Cristina Acosta
 Joe Baracho as Francis Acosta
 Mikoy Morales as Chester Balboa
 Bryan Benedict as Elvis Emerson

Guest cast
 Nathalie Hart as young Precy
 Juancho Trivino as young Victor
 Ernie Zarate
 Kylie Padilla as Roxanne / Katie
 Kiko Estrada as Philip
 Bea Binene as Heidilyn Balboa

Ratings
According to AGB Nielsen Philippines' Mega Manila household television ratings, the pilot episode of More Than Words earned a 21.6% rating. While the final episode scored a 19.1% rating. The series had its highest rating on January 13, 2015 with a 22.2% rating.

References

External links
 
 

2014 Philippine television series debuts
2015 Philippine television series endings
Filipino-language television shows
GMA Network drama series
Philippine romantic comedy television series
Television shows set in Quezon City